Deglazing is a process by which the surface of an engine cylinder is roughened to create friction between the moving parts and allow engine oil to grip the sides of the cylinder.

Details
In a gasoline or diesel engine, the pistons ride up and down within the engine maintaining a tight seal via the piston rings. Over time, the constant rubbing of the rings against the cylinder wall can polish it to a very smooth finish. This creates problems in two ways. First, the lubricating oil in the engine will not adhere properly to the smooth surface, and in the absence of an oil film the resulting friction is increased. Secondly, while breaking in newly installed piston rings, a minute amount of wear must occur between rings and cylinder wall in order to seat the rings properly, and ensure a gas-tight seal. If the cylinder walls are too smooth, this wear will not occur, with the rings "skating" over the polished surface.

In order to correct the situation, a mechanic can take the engine apart, and deglaze the cylinders, usually using an abrasive. This creates a roughly 45 degree angle crosshatching of tiny grooves in the cylinder wall, and restores the engine's performance. Crosshatching that deviates too far from 45 degrees can either cause an unwanted accumulation of oil or be unable to hold on to the oil entirely.

References

Motor vehicle maintenance